Morris is a town in Jefferson County, Alabama, United States. It is north of the Birmingham suburb of  Gardendale. It initially incorporated on September 19, 1885. At some point after 1910, its incorporation lapsed and it failed to appear on the census rolls beginning in 1920 through to 1950. It reincorporated on July 11, 1950. The population as of the 2010 U.S. Census was 1,859, up from 1,827 in 2000.

Geography
Morris is located at  (33.747374, -86.807023).

The town is named after Mary Hunter "Mae" Morris, an early female pioneer of the region.

Demographics

2000 census
At the 2000 census the total population was 1,922. There were 708 households and 575 families in the town. The racial makeup of the town was 98.54% White, 0.5% Black or African American, 0.01% Native American, 0.3% Asian, 0.1% from other races, and 0.60% from two or more races. 0.38% of the population were Hispanic or Latino of any race.
Of the 662 households 43.5% had children under the age of 18 living with them, 71.0% were married couples living together, 9.5% had a female householder with no husband present, and 17.1% were non-families. 15.4% of households were one person and 5.9% were one person aged 65 or older. The average household size was 2.76 and the average family size was 3.07.

The age distribution was 28.4% under the age of 18, 8.3% from 18 to 24, 32.5% from 25 to 44, 22.0% from 45 to 64, and 8.9% 65 or older. The median age was 34 years. For every 100 females, there were 94.2 males. For every 100 females age 18 and over, there were 90.0 males.

The median household income was $46,296 and the median family income  was $51,314. Males had a median income of $38,500 versus $31,224 for females. The per capita income for the town was $19,924. About 0.3% of families and 0.5% of the population were below the poverty line, including none of those under age 18 and 2.0% of those age 65 or over.

2010 census
At the 2010 census the total population was 1,859. There were 719 households and 555 families in the town. The racial makeup of the town was 97.7% White, 1.0% Black or African American, 0.1% Native American, 0.3% Asian, 0.5% from other races, and 0.4% from two or more races. 1.1% of the population were Hispanic or Latino of any race.
Of the 719 households 33.1% had children under the age of 18 living with them, 62.4% were married couples living together, 10.4% had a female householder with no husband present, and 22.8% were non-families. 19.9% of households were one person and 9.4% were one person aged 65 or older. The average household size was 2.59 and the average family size was 2.98.

The age distribution was 23.2% under the age of 18, 8.4% from 18 to 24, 24.1% from 25 to 44, 30.0% from 45 to 64, and 14.3% 65 or older. The median age was 41.4 years. For every 100 females, there were 90.3 males. For every 100 females age 18 and over, there were 90.6 males.

The median household income was $61,188 and the median family income  was $68,333. Males had a median income of $48,125 versus $38,611 for females. The per capita income for the town was $27,390. About 2.6% of families and 3.4% of the population were below the poverty line, including 3.3% of those under age 18 and 2.5% of those age 65 or over.

2020 census

As of the 2020 United States census, there were 2,259 people, 751 households, and 552 families residing in the town.

Public safety
Morris is served by a full-time police force and by a volunteer/part-time fire department. The police department is dispatched by Warrior police and the fire department is dispatched by Jefferson County 911.

Education
Bryan Elementary School, North Jefferson Middle School  and Mortimer Jordan High School are all located in the nearby City of Kimberly.

Notable people
Haylie McCleney, US Softball Olympian
Peter Tom Willis, former NFL quarterback
Pat Buttram, star of Green Acres as Mr. Haney and Gene Autry Sidekick

References

External links
 Town of Morris
 Best Small Towns in Alabama

Towns in Jefferson County, Alabama
Towns in Alabama
Birmingham metropolitan area, Alabama